Turtlepoint is an unincorporated community in Annin Township, McKean County, Pennsylvania, United States. Turtlepoint has a post office with ZIP code 16750. The Allegheny River flows through the area.

The area is notable for its large, flat farm fields, a rarity in mountainous Northern Pennsylvania. The community is also home to a gravel pit business.

A center of the community is Carlsons' Store, which features a grocery store, meat market, deli, US Post Office, and agricultural supplies/feed store.  It has been operated by the Carlson family for several generations and is a rare remaining example of the general stores that were common in rural parts of North America in the middle of the twentieth century.

Filming of Unstoppable 
Parts of the 2010 film Unstoppable were filmed in Turtlepoint and many of the small communities nearby.  The scene involving the horse trailer being hit by the train was filmed at Carlsons' Store.

Notable person
Susan "Busty Heart" Sykes, big-bust entertainer, owns a strip club in the hamlet

References

Unincorporated communities in McKean County, Pennsylvania
Unincorporated communities in Pennsylvania